Alana Shipp (born 1982) is a Barbadan professional female bodybuilder, based in Jerusalem.

Early life
Alana Shipp was born in 1982 in Bridgetown, Barbados to Guyanese parents. She spent her early childhood in Guyana prior to moving to Queens, New York City, New York at age 11.

Career

Marine Corps
After graduating high school, Shipp enlisted in the US Marine Corps and spent almost 8 years as a Marine. She was a non-commissioned officer, working as a logistics procurement manager in Okinawa, Japan; Camp Pendleton, California; and in New Orleans, Louisiana. In late 2008, she moved to Israel.

Fitness

Amateur
In 2011, Shipp began working out in order lose some weight she gained during her two pregnancies and hoping to get into better shape for an upcoming Marine Corps ball. In October 2011, she began working out with Lia Finkelberg Elbaz and Meny Elbaz at their Jerusalem boutique gym, Sky Gym and suggested training her for a bodybuilding competition in the fitness category.

Contest history
 2012 NAC Ms. Israel - 1st (Ms Fitness)

Bodybuilding

Amateur
Shipp said she was originally planning on competing at the 2012 Ms. Universe on the figure category but gained muscle mass faster than expected. Her training coach is Arthur Gooden. At the 2013 NPC National Championship, Shipp won the middleweight division and won her IFBB pro card.

Professional
In 2014, during Shipp first year competing as a professional she qualified for the 2014 Ms. Olympia. At the 2014 Ms. Olympia, she mirrored Sheila Bleck's success at the 2010 Ms. Olympia by winning 4th place at her first Ms. Olympia she attended and during first year she competed as a professional.

Contest history
 2012 NAC Ms. Universe - 3rd (Ms Body/Physique)
 2013 NPC Steve Stone Metropolitan - 1st (LW and overall)
 2013 NPC National Championship - 1st (MW)
 2014 IFBB Toronto Pro - 2nd place
 2014 IFBB Omaha Pro - 5th
 2014 IFBB Ms. Olympia - 4th
 2015 IFBB Wings of Strength PBW Tampa Pro - 2nd
 2015 IFBB Wings of Strength Rising Phoenix World Championships - 5th
 2016 IFBB Wings of Strength Rising Phoenix World Championships – 16th

Personal life

Shipp currently lives in Virginia with her husband Kenneth Shipp, a U.S. Consulate employee, and her two children. Prior to taking up bodybuilding, she was a housewife. Before arriving in Jerusalem she worked as a procurement manager for Coca-Cola in Dallas, Texas.  She is a Christian.

External links

References

1982 births
African-American Christians
African-American female bodybuilders
American expatriate sportspeople in Israel
Barbadan female bodybuilders
Guyanese Christians
Guyanese emigrants to the United States
Guyanese female bodybuilders
Living people
Professional bodybuilders
Sportspeople from Jerusalem
Sportspeople from Queens, New York
United States Marines
Israeli people of Guyanese descent
Israeli people of Barbadian descent
21st-century African-American sportspeople
21st-century African-American women
20th-century African-American people
20th-century African-American women